The 2015 Women's National Invitation Tournament was a single-elimination tournament of 64 NCAA Division I teams that were not selected to participate in the 2015 Women's NCAA tournament. The annual tournament began on March 18 and ended on April 4, with the championship game televised on CBS Sports Network. All games were played on the campus sites of participating schools. The Tournament was won by the UCLA Bruins who defeated the West Virginia Mountaineers, 62–60, in the final before a crowd of 8,658 at the Charleston Civic Center in Charleston, West Virginia, on April 4. It was UCLA's first WNIT title. UCLA's Jordin Canada was named the tournament's most valuable player.

Participants
Sixty-four teams were selected to participate in the 2015 WNIT. Thirty-two teams received automatic berths into the tournament from being the highest-ranked team in their conference that failed to make the NCAA Women's Tournament. The other 32 teams earned at-large bids, by having a winning record but failing to make the NCAA Women's Tournament. If a conference’s automatic qualifier declines the WNIT invitation, the conference forfeits that automatic spot, and that selection goes into the pool of at-large schools.

Automatic qualifiers

At-large bids

Bracket

West Region

Midwest Region

* - Denotes overtime

South Region

* - Denotes overtime

East Region

* - Denotes overtime

Semifinals and championship game

* - Denotes overtime

Championship Game was played at Charleston Civic Center, Charleston, West Virginia.

All-tournament team
 Jordin Canada, UCLA (MVP)
 Nicole Elmblad, Michigan
 Averee Fields, West Virginia
 Nirra Fields, UCLA
 Bria Holmes, West Virginia
 Tyonna Williams, Temple
Source:

See also
 2015 NCAA Division I women's basketball tournament
 2015 Women's Basketball Invitational
 2015 National Invitation Tournament

References

Women's National Invitation Tournament
Women's National Invitation Tournament
Women's National Invitation Tournament
Women's National Invitation Tournament
Women's National Invitation Tournament